≤Ruo may refer to:

 Ruo (state), a small vassal state during the Chinese Zhou Dynasty
 Istro-Romanian language, spoken in Croatia (ISO 639 code = ruo)
 Huang Ruo, a Chinese-born American composer
 Ruo River, a tributary of the Shire River in Malawi and Mozambique
 Ruo Shui, a large river of northern China
 Emoh Ruo is a 1985 Australian comedy film
 Ruo, Micronesia, a village and municipality in the state of Chuuk
RUO, an abbreviation for "Research Use Only": designation for diagnostic products or reagents by the FDA